Emertonius is a genus of spiders in the jumping spider family Salticidae.

Taxonomy
Emertonius was first described by George and Elizabeth Peckham in 1892. It was variously treated as a synonym of Myrmarachne or a separate genus from 1978 onwards. Jerzy Prószyński revalidated the genus in 2018, and it is accepted by the World Spider Catalog .

When included in Myrmarachne, it was placed in subfamily Salticinae (clade Salticoida, tribe Myrmarachnini) in Maddison's 2016 classification of the family Salticidae. Prószyński placed the separate genus in his informal group "myrmarachnines".

Species
, the World Spider Catalog accepted the following extant species:
Emertonius exasperans (Peckham & Peckham, 1892) (type species) – Indonesia (Java, Bali)
Emertonius koomeni Prószyński, 2018 – Malaysia (Borneo)
Emertonius malayanus (Edmunds & Prószyński, 2003) – Malaysia (peninsula, Borneo), Indonesia (Sumatra, Borneo)
Emertonius palawensis Prószyński, 2018 – Philippines
Emertonius shelfordi (Peckham & Peckham, 1907) – Malaysia (Borneo)

References

Salticidae
Salticidae genera